John Bridgeman (c. 1655–1729), of Prinknash Park, Gloucestershire, was an English politician.

He was a Member (MP) of the Parliament of England for Gloucester February to November 1701. He married the daughter of Sir Charles Berkeley who inherited the Berkeley estates in Gloucestershire. On his death in 1729 his widow took charge of lands around Gloucester including what is now Prinknash Abbey.

References

1655 births
1729 deaths
People from Stroud District
Members of the Parliament of England (pre-1707) for Gloucester
English MPs 1701